Trougout (Tarifit: Truggut, ⵜⵔⵓⴳⴳⵓⵜ; Arabic: تروكوت) is a commune in Driouch Province, Oriental, Morocco. At the time of the 2004 census, the commune had a total population of 11,541 people living in 1745 households.

References

Populated places in Driouch Province
Rural communes of Oriental (Morocco)